Spy Story may refer to:

 Spy Story (novel), a 1974 spy novel by Len Deighton
 Spy Story (film), a 1976 British espionage film, based on the novel